Vetren is a small town in the Pazardzhik Province, Bulgaria. It is one of the newest towns in the country, as it gained its town status in 2003. The population is 3,355. Vetren is located in a rich agricultural region close to the Trakiya motorway.

Populated places in Pazardzhik Province
Towns in Bulgaria